Heinlein is a surname.

Heinlein may also refer to:

 6371 Heinlein, an asteroid named for Dieter Heinlein, a German amateur astronomer
 Heinlein (crater), a crater on Mars named for Robert A. Heinlein
 Heinlein Society, a foundation formed to honor Robert A. Heinlein
 Heinlein Prize for Advances in Space Commercialization, founded by Robert Heinlein
 Robert A. Heinlein Award, "for outstanding published works in science fiction and technical writings to inspire the human exploration of space"